Linda Camilla Algotsson (born 22 March 1972 in Rockneby, Sweden) is a Swedish Olympic eventing rider. She competed at five Summer Olympics (in 1996, 2004, 2008, 2012 and 2016). She finished 4th in team eventing on two occasions (in 2008 and 2012). Meanwhile, her current best individual Olympic result is 13th place from 2008.

Linda Algotsson also participated at five World Equestrian Games (each edition between 1994 and 2010) and at five European Eventing Championships (in 1999, 2003, 2005, 2009 and 2013). She won two individual silver medals at the European Championships with the horse Stand By Me. At the 2005 Europeans she finished 4th in the team portion.

She is the older sister of the fellow rider Sara Algotsson Ostholt. Her brother-in-law, Frank Ostholt, is also an eventing rider.

References

1972 births
Swedish female equestrians
Living people
Olympic equestrians of Sweden
Equestrians at the 1996 Summer Olympics
Equestrians at the 2004 Summer Olympics
Equestrians at the 2008 Summer Olympics
Equestrians at the 2012 Summer Olympics
Equestrians at the 2016 Summer Olympics
People from Kalmar Municipality
Sportspeople from Kalmar County